Carbon satellites in physics and spectroscopy, are small peaks that can be seen shouldering the main peaks in the nuclear magnetic resonance (NMR) spectrum.  These peaks can occur in the NMR spectrum of any NMR active atom (e.g. 19F or 31P NMR) where those atoms adjoin a carbon atom (and where the spectrum is not 13C-decoupled, which is usually the case).  However, Carbon satellites are most often encountered in proton NMR.

In the example of proton NMR, these peaks are not the result of proton-proton coupling, but result from the coupling of 1H atoms to an adjoining 13C atom. These small peaks are known as carbon satellites as they are small and appear around the main 1H peak i.e. satellite (around) to them.  Carbon satellites are small because 13C only makes up about 1% of the atomic carbon content of carbon, the rest of the carbon atoms are predominantly NMR inactive 12C.  Carbon satellites always appear as an evenly spaced pair around the main 1H peak. This is because they are the result of 1% of the 1H atoms coupling to an adjoined 13C atom to give a wide doublet (13C has a spin of a half).  Note, if the main 1H-peak has proton-proton coupling, then each satellite will be a miniature version of the main peak and will also show this 1H-coupling, e.g. if the main 1H-peak is a doublet, then the carbon satellites will appear as miniature doublets, i.e. one doublet on either side of the main 1H-peak.

For other NMR atoms (e.g. 19F or 31P atoms), the same applies as above, but obviously where the proton atom is replaced with that other NMR active atom e.g. 31P.

Sometime other peaks can be seen around 1H peaks, these are known as spinning sidebands and are related to the rate of spin of an NMR tube.

Carbon satellites (and spinning sidebands) should not be confused with impurity peaks.

Uses
 
 
Carbon satellites can be used to obtain structural information, which is not available by looking at the main peaks in the NMR spectrum.

This usually occurs when the purely 12C compound is symmetrical but where the 1% of the compound which has a 13C atom in it is no longer symmetrical.

For example, you can not tell if stilbene (Ph-CH=CH-Ph) has a cis- or trans- double bond just by examining at the main peaks in the 1H NMR spectrum.  The =CH- proton does not couple to the adjacent =CH- proton as the molecule is symmetrical.  However 1% of the stilbene molecules will have a 13C atom on one of these double bond carbons (i.e. Ph-13CH=12CH-Ph). In this situation, the proton adjacent to 13C atom will couple to the 13C atom to give a wide doublet. Also, as this molecule is no longer symmetric the 13CH= proton will now couple to the adjacent 12CH=  proton, causing a further doubleting.  Thus this additional coupling (additional to the 13C coupling) is diagnostic of the type of double bond, and will allow one to determine if the stilbene molecule has a cis- or trans- configuration i.e. by examining the size of the diagnostic J coupling constant from -CH=CH- bond. Thus only a single 1H NMR spectrum is needed, albeit with close inspection of the satellite peaks, rather than any further complex NMR or derivative chemical experiments.

The same would be seen for 1,2-Dichloroethene.

See also
 not to be confused with side band spinning effect,
1H NMR
13C NMR

References

Further reading
 NMR SATELLITES AS A PROBE FOR CHEMICAL INVESTIGATIONS SHIzuo FUJIWARA, Yogi ARATA, HIR0sHI OZAWA and MASAYUKI KuruGI Department of Chemistry, The University of Tokyo, Japan 
 Y. Ogimura, S. Fujiwara and K. Nagashima, Chemical Instrumentation 1, 21 (1968)
 S. Fujiwara, Y. Yano and K. Nagishima, Chemical Instrumentation 2, 103 (1969)
 S. Fujiwara, Magnetic Resonance, ed., C. K. Coogan et a!., Plenum Press, New York (1970).
 
 
 
 
 
 
 

Nuclear magnetic resonance
Carbon